{{DISPLAYTITLE:C19H23NO}}
The molecular formula C19H23NO (molar mass: 281.39 g/mol, exact mass: 281.1780 u) may refer to:

 Alimadol
 Blarcamesine (ANAVEX2-73)
 Cinnamedrine
 Diphenylpyraline
 Naphyrone
 SCH-5472